Román Díaz (born July 31, 1980 in Moreno, Argentina) is an Argentine footballer currently playing for Club Almirante Brown.

Teams
  Chacarita Juniors 2001–2003
  San Lorenzo 2003–2004
  Atlas de Guadalajara 2004
  Lanús 2005
  Rosario Central 2005
  Lanús 2006
  Deportes Quindío 2007
  Almirante Brown 2007–2008
  Almagro 2009
  Instituto de Córdoba 2009
  Almirante Brown 2010
  Everton de Viña del Mar 2011
  Almirante Brown 2012–
  Douglas Haig 2012

Titles
  Almirante Brown (Primera B Metropolitana 2009/2010)

References
 Profile at BDFA 
 

1980 births
Living people
People from Moreno Partido
Sportspeople from Buenos Aires Province
Argentine footballers
Argentine expatriate footballers
Chacarita Juniors footballers
San Lorenzo de Almagro footballers
Rosario Central footballers
Club Atlético Lanús footballers
Club Almagro players
Instituto footballers
Atlas F.C. footballers
Deportes Quindío footballers
Everton de Viña del Mar footballers
Club Almirante Brown footballers
Club Atlético Douglas Haig players
Primera B Metropolitana players
Categoría Primera A players
Expatriate footballers in Chile
Expatriate footballers in Mexico
Expatriate footballers in Colombia
Association football midfielders